Konstantin Konstantinovich Pervukhin (2 June 1863 in Kharkov – 8 February 1915 in Moscow) was a Ukrainian and Russian Impressionist landscape painter, writer and photographer; associated with the Peredvizhniki.

Biography 
His father was a surveyor for the local government. He began his art studies with the well-known Ukrainian pedagogue and artist, Dmytro Bezperchy. From 1884 to 1885, he studied at the "Kharkov School of Drawing" (now the "Kharkov State Academy of Design and Arts") with its founder, Maria Raevskaia-Ivanova.

After 1885, he lived in Saint Petersburg, where he took private lessons from Ilya Repin. From 1886 to 1887, he was an occasional student at the Imperial Academy of Arts and worked with Professor Pavel Chistyakov. That same year, he became a member of the Peredvizhniki and later had several paintings purchased by Pavel Tretyakov.

In 1902, he moved to Moscow and served as a teacher at the Stroganov Moscow State University of Arts and Industry until 1912. He resigned from the Peredvizhniki in 1903 and, together with Apollinary Vasnetsov, Abram Arkhipov, Alexei Stepanov, Ilya Ostroukhov and others, became one of the founders of the "Union of Russian Artists", which existed until 1923.

He also worked as an illustrator for periodicals such as the Ежегодник императорских театров (Yearbook of the Imperial Theaters), Живописное обозрение стран света (Pictorial View of the World) and Всемирная иллюстрация (Worldwide Illustration). In 1910, his photographs earned him a membership in the "Русское фотографическое обществорация" (Russian Photographic Society).

Selected paintings

References

External links

1863 births
1915 deaths
Artists from Kharkiv
People from Kharkovsky Uyezd
Russian illustrators
Peredvizhniki
Landscape painters
Russian male painters
19th-century painters from the Russian Empire
19th-century male artists from the Russian Empire
20th-century Russian painters
20th-century Russian male artists
Academic staff of Stroganov Moscow State Academy of Arts and Industry